Indus News was an English language Pakistani international news channel launched in November 2018. It was part of Aap Media Network and was broadcast on Paksat. The channel was based in Islamabad.

History
The channel was owned by Pakistani business tycoon and founder of Bahria Town, Malik Riaz Hussain. The network's Chief Executive Officer (CEO) was Saniya Malik.

On 14 September 2021, the channel temporarily suspended operations, citing "unavoidable legal and technical issues". It was the second channel owned by him to be shut down, after Aap News.

Anchors and shows 

 Ejaz Haider – In Focus South Asia
 Chef Basim Akhund – Indus Cuisine
 Waqar Rizvi – Scope
 Mina Malik Hussain – Coffee Table
 Nosheen Bukhari — iBuzz
 Alamdar Khan – The Sports Insight
 Addiel Sabir — Quest
 Hira Mustafa – Visitor's Book
 Raja Sarosh Sohaib - News Anchor
 Joseph Hayat - News Anchor

See also 
 List of news channels in Pakistan

References

Bahria Town
24-hour television news channels in Pakistan
Television channels and stations established in 2018
Television channels and stations disestablished in 2021
English-language television stations in Pakistan
2018 establishments in Pakistan
2021 disestablishments in Pakistan